The James and Susan R. Langton House, located at 648 East 100 South in Salt Lake City, Utah, United States, was built in 1908. It was listed on the National Register of Historic Places in 1982.

Description
The house was found in a survey of the South and Central area of Salt Lake City to be notable as "an unusually well-designed eclectic version of the Box style house." It was designed by Bernard O. Mecklenburg. The house was built for $10,000.

See also

 National Register of Historic Places listings in Salt Lake City

References

External links

Houses on the National Register of Historic Places in Utah
Houses completed in 1908
Houses in Salt Lake City
National Register of Historic Places in Salt Lake City
1908 establishments in Utah